The Lough is the name of a suburb of Cork City, the electoral division in which it lies, the body of water that gives the area its name and a Roman Catholic parish of the same name. It lies on the south side of the city. The Lough is part of the Cork South-Central Dáil constituency.

Lake 
The Lough is a shallow spring-fed freshwater lake with an average depth of one metre and a total area of 4 hectares. It is a wildfowl preserve, particularly for swans, and has been a protected area since 1881. The Lough is also used for coarse angling (on a 'strictly catch and release basis') and is home to fish species such as carp, eel, tench, rudd and perch.

Demographics
The Lough district is close to the main University College Cork campus, and has a high density of student accommodation.

References 

Geography of Cork (city)
Parks in Cork (city)